The Jaco class is a class of two patrol boats operated by the Timor Leste Defence Force's Naval Component. The boats were built in China to the Type 062 class gunboat (also known as the Shanghai II class) design. The two boats are named Jaco and Betano and were commissioned into East Timorese service in late June 2010.

References

Military of East Timor
2010 ships